The D-Day Dodgers were Allied servicemen who fought in Italy during the Second World War. The D-Day Dodgers also inspired a popular wartime soldier's song (Roud Folk Song Index no. 10499).

A rumour spread during the war that the term was publicized by  Viscountess Astor, a Member of the British Parliament, who supposedly used the expression in public after a disillusioned serviceman in Italy signed a letter to her as being from a "D-Day Dodger". However, there is no record that she actually said this, in or out of Parliament, and she herself denied ever saying it.

Reference to a "D-Day Dodger" was bitingly sarcastic, given the steady stream of Allied service personnel who were being killed or wounded in combat on the Italian front. A "dodger" is someone who avoids something; the soldiers in Italy felt that their sacrifices were being ignored after the invasion of Normandy, and a "D-Day Dodger" was a reference to someone who was supposedly avoiding real combat by serving in Italy, whereas the reality was anything but.

The Ballad of the D-Day Dodgers
Several versions of a song called "D-Day Dodgers", set to the tune "Lili Marleen" (a favourite song of all troops in the North African Campaign – the British Eighth Army was a veteran formation from that theatre before landing in Italy), were sung with gusto in the last months of the war, and at post-war reunions.

The song was written in November 1944 by Lance-Sergeant Harry Pynn of the Tank Rescue Section, 19 Army Fire Brigade, who was with the 78th Infantry Division just south of Bologna, Italy. There were many variations on verses and even the chorus, but the song generally and sarcastically referred to how easy their life in Italy was. There was no mention of Lady Astor in the original lyrics. Many Allied personnel in Italy had reason to be bitter, as the bulk of material support for the Allied armies went to Northwest Europe after the invasion of Normandy. They also noted sardonically that they had participated in several "D-days" of their own before the landings in Normandy became popularly known as "D-Day". The expression was used to refer to the day that any military operation began (with "H-hour" being the specific start time of an operation beginning on D-day), but the popular press turned it into an expression synonymous with the Normandy landings only. Italian campaign veterans noted that they had been in action for eleven months before the Normandy landings, and some of those had served in North Africa even before that.

The numerous Commonwealth War Graves Commission cemeteries across Italy are compelling evidence of the fighting which took place during campaigns such as Operation Avalanche and the subsequent Battle of Monte Cassino.

Although Hamish Henderson did not write the song, he did collect different versions of it and it is attributed to him in the sleeve notes of the Ian Campbell Folk Group's "Contemporary Campbells". Many different variations have been recorded.

Recordings of D-Day Dodgers
  Pete Seeger on The Complete Bowdoin College Concert 1960 (recorded 1960 released 2011)
  Ian Campbell Folk Group on Contemporary Campbells (1965)
  The Clancy Brothers and Tommy Makem on Home Boys Home (1968)
  The Leesiders (UK folk duo) on The Leesiders (1968)
  The Spinners (UK folk band) on By Arrangement (1973)
  The Yetties on Argo LP "Up in Arms" (1974) track listed as "Lili Marlele"
  Hamish Imlach on A Man's A Man (Autogram ALLP 215), (1978)
  Ian Robb on From Different Angels (1994)
  Pete Seeger on Kisses Sweeter Than Wine (1996)
  Kathy Hampson's Free Elastic Band (est. 1990s)
  The Houghton Weavers on Songs of Conflict (2012)

Literature
: sketches the history of Canadian military participation in the Italian Campaign.
War Story D-Day Dodgers by Garth Ennis and John Higgins was a graphic novel published in 2001 by Vertigo DC Comics. It contains a version of the song.
Holman, James (2008). D-Day Dodger: Memories of a Canadian Foot Soldier in Italy. . Account of a soldier's experience during the Italian campaign. Contains black and white photos.

See also
Reappropriation
Operation Husky
Operation Shingle
Allied invasion of Italy
Gustav Line
Volturno Line
Winter Line
British military history of World War II
Fourteenth Army (United Kingdom), the Forgotten Army
List of anti-war songs

References

Songs about soldiers
Songs about the military
Italian campaign (World War II)
Songs of World War II
Anti-war songs
1944 songs